Beaverdam Creek is a stream in Butler and
Ripley counties in the Ozarks of southern Missouri. It is a tributary of the Little Black River.

The stream flows to the south and east entering Butler County about one mile southeast of the headwaters and about two miles southwest of the community of Milltown. The confluence is about two miles north of the US Route 160 crossing of the Little Black and about three miles northeast of the community of Fairdealing. Poplar Bluff lies about nine miles east-northeast of the confluence.

Beaverdam Creek was so named on account of beaver dams on its course.

See also
List of rivers of Missouri

References

Rivers of Butler County, Missouri
Rivers of Ripley County, Missouri
Rivers of Missouri